Peter Warburton was an English explorer.

Peter Warburton may also refer to:

Peter Warburton (judge) (c. 1540–1621), British judge
Peter Warburton (1588–1666), English barrister and judge
Peter Warburton (footballer) (born 1951), Australian rules footballer for Carlton
Sir Peter Warburton, 2nd Baronet (died 1698), of the Warburton baronets
Sir Peter Warburton, 4th Baronet (1708–1774), of the Warburton baronets
Sir Peter Warburton, 5th Baronet (1754–1813), of the Warburton baronets

See also
Warburton (disambiguation)